Lose Control is the debut extended play by Chinese singer Lay (Zhang Yixing). It was released on October 28, 2016 in South Korea and China by SM Entertainment and distributed by KT Music. The EP features six tracks in total, including the two singles "what U need?" and "Lose Control".

The EP was a commercial success peaking at number 1 on the Gaon Album Chart and 7th of 
Best-Selling Albums of 2016 and broke seven out of eight Guinness World Records on the YinYueTai China Weekly Charts.

Background and release 
On September 21, 2016 it was announced that Lay would release his first solo album in October. "what U need?" was released on October 7 as Lay's birthday gift for his fans.

On October 21 it was revealed that Lay would release his first mini-album Lose Control on October 28 in South Korea and China and that the album consists of 6 Chinese tracks. The single "what U need?" was included in this mini-album. Lay was a producer, and personally in charge of the composition, arrangement and writing the lyrics of all the songs. On October 25, 2016, S.M. Entertainment released a teaser for the music video of "Lose Control". Lose Control was officially released on October 28 through online and regular stores.

Singles 
The song "Lose Control" stayed as #1 on Billboard's China V Chart for 6 weeks in a row. It also topped "Alibaba Top 100 Weekly Songs" for 14 weeks in a row and ranked #1 on YinYueTai's TOP 100 Songs of 2016.

"what U need?" hit the #4 spot on the China V Chart as well as in Billboard's World Digital Songs. The song reached number one on the Alibaba real time music chart in China.

Promotion 
On October 27, Lay held a press conference for the mini-album at Shanghai Town & Country Community in China. Lay performed "what U need?" for the first time on October 9 at the 2016 Asia Song Festival in Busan, South Korea. On November 15, Lay made his debut performance on the music program The Show.

Commercial performance 

The physical album sales exceeded 50,000 copies a day after its release. On the first weekend have exceeded 97,000, and had sold more than 125,000 in 7 days. Over 1,000,000 copies of the digital album has been sold on Xiami.

The album broke seven out of eight Guinness World Records on the YinYueTai China Weekly Charts. The accompanying music video was #1 on real-time (98.54) and weekly (100.00). The album ranked at #1 for consecutively 6 weeks on the YinYueTai China Weekly Song Charts. The album sold 260,000 physical copies in 2016.

The album is also the highest selling album by a solo artist in Hanteo charts with 247,660 copies sold. On January 23, 2017, it was revealed that the album sold over 250,000 copies on Hanteo since its release.

Track listing

Charts

Weekly charts

Monthly charts

Year-end charts

Awards

Sales

Release history

References

External links 
 
 

2016 debut EPs
SM Entertainment EPs
Lay Zhang albums
Mandopop EPs
Dance-pop EPs
Genie Music EPs